Major-General James Spens,  (30 March 1853 – 19 August 1934) was an English first-class cricketer and an officer in the British Army. Spens began playing cricket whilst at school, and after joining the Army played for Hampshire and the Marylebone Cricket Club in the 1880s. He briefly returned to first-class cricket in 1897–98, again for Hampshire. During the Second Boer War, he led an infantry battalion and a mobile column, then later commanded a military district in India and a Territorial division in the United Kingdom. He retired shortly before the outbreak of the First World War, when he returned to service, commanding the 12th (Eastern) Division, then a training depot and a military district in Egypt.

Early life and sporting career

Spens was educated at Haileybury and Imperial Service College, where he represented the college cricket team from 1868 to 1870. Spens was a right-handed batsman who was an underarm bowler, although with which hand he bowled with and what style he bowled is unknown. Spens was commissioned into the 85th Regiment of Foot (Bucks Volunteers) on 29 May 1872.

After joining the Army, Spens played both cricket and rackets for Army teams, including a match at Lord's in 1887. He was a high scorer, at one point in 1882 hitting 386 in a match. His cricketing career was interrupted by military duties in 1879–80, when his regiment served in the Second Anglo-Afghan War, but after his return to England, Spens made his first-class debut for Hampshire against Kent in 1884. On debut, he scored his maiden first-class half century with a score of 60.

Two years later Spens made his debut for the Marylebone Cricket Club, making his debut for the club against Derbyshire and playing two more matches against Lancashire and Nottinghamshire.

In 1897, fourteen years after playing his last first-class match for Hampshire, Spens returned to county for the 1897 season, playing his first return match against Cambridge University and a second match in the same season against the Gentlemen of Philadelphia, which gave Spens his maiden and only first-class century with a score of 118*. In 1898, Spens played seven first-class matches for Hampshire, with his final first-class match for the county coming against Sussex.

Senior command

Spens was sent to South Africa following the outbreak of the Second Boer War in October 1899. He initially commanded the 2nd Battalion, King's Shropshire Light Infantry, followed by a command of a mobile column in 1901–1902. He was promoted to the brevet rank of colonel during the war, and mentioned in despatches several times (including by Lord Kitchener on 23 June 1902). After the end of the war in June 1902, he returned to the United Kingdom in the SS Dunottar Castle, which arrived at Southampton the following month. For his service in the war Spens was appointed a Companion of the Order of the Bath (CB) in the April 1901 South Africa Honours list (the award was backdated to 29 November 1900) and he received the actual decoration from King Edward VII at Buckingham Palace on 24 October 1902.

He was placed on half-pay in August 1902, but was back in full service as commander of the Allahabad District in India in August 1903 and the 21st Bareilly Brigade in India in March 1906. He was given command of the Lowland Division in the Territorial Force in March 1910. He relinquished command and retired from the Army in 1914.

On the outbreak of the First World War, however, Spens was recalled to service, and given command of the newly raised 12th (Eastern) Division in the New Armies in August 1914. He commanded it through its training in England, relinquishing command in March 1915 before it was sent overseas, and in April 1915 was appointed to take over command of the ANZAC Training Depot in Egypt. He remained here until November, when he became General Officer Commanding Cairo District. Spens left Cairo in April 1916.

He was also a member of the British Fascists.

Spens died at Folkestone, Kent on 19 June 1934.

References

|-

1853 births
1934 deaths
People educated at Haileybury and Imperial Service College
English cricketers
Hampshire cricketers
Marylebone Cricket Club cricketers
British Army generals of World War I
Companions of the Order of the Bath
Companions of the Order of St Michael and St George
King's Shropshire Light Infantry officers
British Army personnel of the Second Boer War
English fascists
Military personnel of British India